Elections to Aylesbury Vale District Council were held on 1 May 2003.  The whole council was up for election with boundary changes since the last election in 1999 increasing the number of councillors by 1. The Conservative Party gained overall control of the council from no overall control.

Results

|}

5 Conservative candidates were unopposed.

By ward

External links
 2003 Aylesbury Vale election result

2003 English local elections
2003
2000s in Buckinghamshire